Paul Worth (born 13 January 1986 in Nottingham) is a British short track speed skater.

Worth competed at the 2010 Winter Olympics for Great Britain. In the 500 metres, he placed third in his round one heat, failing to advance. He was also a member of the British relay team. He did not race in the semifinal, but did race in the B final, which the British won to finish 6th overall.

As of 2013, Worth's best performance at the World Championships came in 2008, when he won a bronze medal as part of the British relay team. His best individual finish also came in 2008, a 19th-place finish in the 1000 meters. He also won a silver medal as a member of the British relay team at the 2008 European Championships.

As of 2013, Worth has two ISU Short Track Speed Skating World Cup podium finishes, both as part of the British relay team. He has won bronze medals in 2007–08 at Salt Lake City and in 2008-09 at Vancouver. His top World Cup ranking is 11th, in the 500 metres in 2007–08.

World Cup Podiums

References 

1986 births
Living people
British male short track speed skaters
Olympic short track speed skaters of Great Britain
Short track speed skaters at the 2010 Winter Olympics
World Short Track Speed Skating Championships medalists
Sportspeople from Nottingham